Dreams of Death is the ninth studio album by the thrash metal band Flotsam and Jetsam. It was released on 26 July 2005.

This album marked another departure from Flotsam and Jetsam's previous works and strict thrash metal approach. Similar to the 1995 Drift album, the band incorporated some new elements of ballad songwriting, acoustic, progressive metal and death metal. Dreams Of Death a concept album revolving around the theme of death-related nightmares. It is a continuation of the song themes in Dreams Of Death, previously recorded on the 1988 album No Place For Disgrace.

Track listing
All tracks by Flotsam and Jetsam

Hidden track
The final song of the album, "Out of Mind" contains a hidden song after. After the central part of the track ends at 4:53 and after 1:30 of silence an alternate acoustic version of the track "Bathing In Red" plays for 5:27.

Personnel 
 Edward Carlson – guitars
 Eric A.K. – vocals
 Jason Ward – bass guitar
 Craig Nielsen – drums
 Mark Simpson – guitars

References

2005 albums
Flotsam and Jetsam (band) albums